Derya Çalışkan (born 1 December 1966) is a Turkish judoka. She competed in the women's half-lightweight event at the 1992 Summer Olympics.

References

1966 births
Living people
Turkish female judoka
Olympic judoka of Turkey
Judoka at the 1992 Summer Olympics
Place of birth missing (living people)